The following is a list of notable events that are related to Philippine music in 2019.

Events

May
 May 15 – The music video of "St4y Up", a collaboration song by Nadine Lustre was named Favorite Artist of the Year and Favorite Music Video at the Myx Music Awards 2019 held at the ABS-CBN Vertis Tent. Rivermaya, was this year's Myx Magna Awardee

July
 July 11 – Myx introduces the five new VJs of the channel, Dani Mortel, Anton Fausto, Aya Fernandez, Ylona Garcia and Edward Barber.
 July 28 
 Zephanie Dimaranan won the first season of Idol Philippines held at the Newport Performing Arts Theater, Resorts World Manila.
 Aicelle Santos finished the 2nd Placer at the ASEAN+3 Song Contest held in Vietnam. Tim Pavino also represented the Philippines in the singing competition.

August
 Coke Studio Philippines announced its lineup of contemporary and indie Filipino acts for Season 3, namely: Sarah Geronimo, UDD, Iñigo Pascual, This Band, Brisom, Janine Teñoso, Al James, Silent Sanctuary, Bea Lorenzo, St. Wolf, Ron Henley, Morissette, Lola Amour, Just Hush, and Clara Benin.

September
 September 9 – Filipino music icon Ryan Cayabyab and four other Asian trailblazers has officially receives the Ramon Magsaysay Award at the Cultural Center of the Philippines.
 September 28 – Elaine Duran from Butuan City was hailed as It's Showtime's Tawag ng Tanghalan Year 3 Grand Champion. It was held at Caloocan Sports Complex, Bagumbong, Caloocan.

October
 October 13 – "Mabagal", which was composed by Dan Tañedo and interpreted by Daniel Padilla and Moira dela Torre, wins Best Song at Himig Handog 2019.
 October 15 – Rock of Manila TV was officially soft launched on all cable TV and Digital providers in the Philippines. It is owned by the Rajah Broadcasting Network.

November
 November 3 – Vanjoss Bayaban, coached by Sarah Geronimo, won the fourth season of The Voice Kids, the grand finals of which were held at the Newport Performing Arts Theater, Resorts World Manila.
 November 9 – Ethel Booba of General Santos emerged as the first-ever Tawag ng Tanghalan Celebrity Grand Champion.

December
 Indie band Meryl won Amplified, Eastwood City's first-ever artist/band search.

Debuts/Disbanded

Soloist
Joyce Pring
KD Estrada
Arvey De Vera
Alex Bruce
Bea Lorenzo
Just Hush
Nik Makino
Michael Dutchi Libranda
MRLD
Zephanie

Duoist/Bands/Groups
Good Kid$
ALLMO$T
ST. WOLF
The Vowels They Orbit
Nathan and Mercury
Lola Amour
Any Name's Okay
COLN
Sandiwa
BRWN
Flu
Ysanygo

Reunion/Comeback
Trio
Jensen Gomez
Ciudad

On hiatus
Tom's Story

Released in 2019
The following albums were released in 2019 locally. Note: All soundtracks are not included in this list.

January

February

March

April

May

June

July

August

September

October

November

December

Concerts and music festivals

Local artists

Note 1. Jed Madela was originally planned to be part of the Visayas and Mindanao legs of the concert but later backed out due to scheduling conflicts with his Higher Than High tour.

International artists

Music festivals

Canceled/postponed dates

Awarding ceremonies
 January 15 – Wish 107.5 Music Awards 2019, organized by Wish 107.5
 May 15 – Myx Music Awards 2019, organized by myx
 July 11 – MOR Pinoy Music Awards 2019, organized by MOR 101.9
 October 10 – 32nd Awit Awards, organized by the Philippine Association of the Record Industry
 January 16 – Brian Velasco, (b. 1977),  drummer (Razorback).
 January 28 – Pepe Smith, (b. 1947),  drummer and guitarist (Juan de la Cruz Band).
 March 5 – Annie Brazil, (born Justiniana Bulawin, 1933), jazz singer.
 March 31 – Ferdie Marquez, founding member of True Faith

References

Philippines
Music
Philippine music industry